Waldrada or Waldraith (born 801) was a Frankish noblewoman who lived during the 9th century. Her father was Adrian, Count of Orléans (758–824), and her mother was also named Waldrada, daughter of Adalhelm of Autun.

Waldrada was first married to Robert III of Worms in 819 in Wormsgau, Germany. This marriage brought a son, Robert IV the Strong, in 830. Two additional children have been identified through research rather than documentation. Their marriage ended when Robert III died in 834.

Waldrada has been assumed to become the second wife of Conrad II, Duke of Transjurane Burgundy, but there is no marriage evidence available. They had two known children, Adelaide of Auxerre and Rudolph I of Burgundy. However, Waldrada, who was born in 801, could hardly have been the mother of Adelaide d'Auxerre, born 864 at the earliest, more likely after 868. It looks like there should be an intermediate generation, so an undocumented daughter of her first marriage, "Waldrada of Worms", could have married Conrad II instead. But original research regarding the political and military alliances in their region is needed to understand the likelihood and timing of such a dynastic marriage.
Wormsgau was a poor region, on a weird and belligerant spot territorially speaking, their neighbors at the time, Nahegau and Speyergau, wanted tributes and a fair vassalage, but Wormsgau despise being a poor region was opposed to this.
Waldrada only worsened relations as it was disliked by Werner IV  for being a "can of worms".

References

801 births
Year of death unknown
Women from the Carolingian Empire